Abbotsford is a suburb of the New Zealand city of Dunedin. It is located to the west of the city centre.

Abbotsford is an entirely residential suburb with virtually no retail or service sector of its own – for these it relies on Green Island.

The Abbotsford landslip

On the night of 8 August 1979, a major landslide occurred in Abbotsford, resulting in the destruction or relocation of some 69 houses, and requiring the evacuation of over 600 people. No-one was killed. This remains the largest landslip to have occurred in an urban area of New Zealand.

Sunnyvale
In the southwest corner of Abbotsford, abutting the northwest corner of Green Island, is the Sunnyvale neighbourhood. Until the early 2000s, the main road route south out of Dunedin passed through Sunnyvale, but it and Fairfield, 2 km to the west, were bypassed by a motorway extension in 2002. The sports arena of Sunnyvale Park, serving Abbotsford and Green Island, is located in the suburb.

Demographics

Abbotsford had a population of 2,817 at the 2018 New Zealand census, an increase of 321 people (12.9%) since the 2013 census, and an increase of 417 people (17.4%) since the 2006 census. There were 1,092 households. There were 1,401 males and 1,413 females, giving a sex ratio of 0.99 males per female. The median age was 38.8 years (compared with 37.4 years nationally), with 549 people (19.5%) aged under 15 years, 528 (18.7%) aged 15 to 29, 1,338 (47.5%) aged 30 to 64, and 405 (14.4%) aged 65 or older.

Ethnicities were 93.9% European/Pākehā, 9.1% Māori, 1.6% Pacific peoples, 2.8% Asian, and 1.3% other ethnicities (totals add to more than 100% since people could identify with multiple ethnicities).

The proportion of people born overseas was 7.8%, compared with 27.1% nationally.

Although some people objected to giving their religion, 65.0% had no religion, 26.2% were Christian, 0.2% were Hindu, 0.2% were Muslim, 0.1% were Buddhist and 1.5% had other religions.

Of those at least 15 years old, 276 (12.2%) people had a bachelor or higher degree, and 525 (23.1%) people had no formal qualifications. The median income was $36,200, compared with $31,800 nationally. 327 people (14.4%) earned over $70,000 compared to 17.2% nationally. The employment status of those at least 15 was that 1,275 (56.2%) people were employed full-time, 339 (14.9%) were part-time, and 69 (3.0%) were unemployed.

Education
Abbotsford School is a state full primary school for Year 1 to 8 students, with a roll of  students as of  It was established in 1953.

References

Suburbs of Dunedin